Ghetto Life 101 is a 30-minute radio broadcast documentary exploring the lives of residents of the South Side of Chicago, Illinois. It was created by teenagers LeAlan Jones and Lloyd Newman and produced by David Isay for National Public Radio. The broadcast garnered international acclaim and won several awards.

Overview
Ghetto Life 101 illustrates life on the South Side of Chicago in 1993. The broadcast footage was recorded by LeAlan Jones and Lloyd Newman, who were thirteen and fourteen, respectively, at the time. The broadcast centered on interviews with the boys' families, friends, and members of the community.

Reception
The broadcast was well received, and praised for its raw portrayal of life in the Chicago projects. It won several awards, including the Sigma Delta Chi Award, and the Corporation for Public Broadcasting's Awards for Excellence in Documentary Radio and Special Achievement in Radio Programming.

Later works

Jones and Newman made a second documentary, Remorse: The 14 Stories of Eric Morse, which explored the backgrounds of people involved with Eric Morse, a five-year-old boy who was thrown from a fourteenth-story window in the Chicago projects by two older boys. This won the Robert F. Kennedy Journalism Award and a Peabody Award in 1996.

The two documentaries and further footage from when Jones and Newman were nearing high school graduation were condensed into a book published in 1997 entitled Our America: Life and Death on the South Side of Chicago.

References

External links
A 2001 update on the boys' lives
An interview with the authors of Our America on Charlie Rose (1997)
Booknotes interview with LeAlan Jones on Our America: Life and Death on the South Side of Chicago, August 3, 1997

Radio documentaries
Public housing in Chicago
1993 in radio
1993 radio programme debuts
NPR programs